Małgorzata Różycka (born 27 June 1962) is a Polish swimmer. She competed in the women's 200 metre butterfly at the 1980 Summer Olympics.

References

External links
 

1962 births
Living people
Olympic swimmers of Poland
Swimmers at the 1980 Summer Olympics
Universiade medalists in swimming
Sportspeople from Kraków
Universiade bronze medalists for Poland
Polish female butterfly swimmers
20th-century Polish women